Global Underground 034: Felix Da Housecat, Milan is a DJ mix album in the Global Underground series and its first compilation of 2008, compiled and mixed by DJ and producer Felix da Housecat. This is the first Global Underground mix for Felix.  It is based on Felix's love for the European fashion centre, Milan.  The first disc is more progressive and the second disc is more electroclash.

Track listing

Disc One
 Chip E. - It's House
 Josh Wink - Thick As Thieves
 Dettmann|Klock – Blank Scenario
 Chris Liebing - Bangbop
 Alex Bau - Halifaxfunk
 Christopher Groove – Maximal MNML (Philipp Straub Edit)
 Sasha - Who Killed Sparky?
 Benny Benassi - Love and Emotion (Instrumental)
 Thomas Bangalter – Outrage
 Felix Da Housecat – Tweak!
 Armando -151
 Pig & Dan - Deliverance
 Dubfire – Emissions
 Par Grindvik - Continue in My Words (Dettman|Klock Remix)
 Man-DA - Principino
 Chymera - Arabesque

Disc Two

 Sally Shapiro – Hold Me So Tight
 Boys Noize – Shine Shine
 Quando Quango - Love Tempo
 Lopazz – 2 Fast 4 U
 JoJo De Freq – Saturn Returns
 Armand Van Helden - Je T'aime (Switch Remix)
 Felix Da Housecat Vs. Diddy – Jack U (Angelo & Ingrosso Remix)
 John Dahlbäck – Blink
 Etienne de Crécy – Punk
 Charlie Fanclub - Nightbreed
 David Carretta - Vicious Game
 Anthony Rother – Moderntronic 1
 Model 500 - No UFOs (Vocal Mix)
 Liaisons Dangereuses - Peut Être…Pas
 Endangered Species – Ping Pong
 Ramsey & Co - Love Call (Harvey's Mix)
 Felix da Housecat - Radio (Shinichi Osawa Remix)
 Kris Menace feat. Fred Falke – Fairlight

References

External links 

Global Underground
2007 compilation albums